Chris Baltisberger (born 31 October 1991) is a Swiss professional ice hockey right wing currently playing for ZSC Lions in the National League (NL).

References

External links

1991 births
Living people
GCK Lions players
Swiss ice hockey right wingers
ZSC Lions players